A Streetcar Named Desire is a 1984 American TV movie directed by John Erman and based on the 1947 play of the same name by Tennessee Williams. The film stars Ann-Margret and Treat Williams and premiered on ABC on March 4, 1984.

Plot summary

Cast
 Ann-Margret as Blanche DuBois
 Treat Williams as Stanley Kowalski
 Beverly D'Angelo as Stella DuBois Kowalski
 Randy Quaid as Harold "Mitch" Mitchell
 Erica Yohn as Eunice
 Fred Sadoff as Doctor
 Elsa Raven as Nurse
 Rafael Campos as Pablo
 Ric Mancini as Steve 
 Raphael Sbarge as The Collector

Awards
The film was nominated in 1984 for 11 36th Primetime Emmy Awards, including Outstanding Drama/Comedy Special, acting awards for Ann-Margret, D'Angelo and Quaid, plus the directing award for John Erman. It did not win those, but did win four awards, for cinematography, film editing, sound, and art direction.

In 1985, Ann-Margret won a Golden Globe Award for Best Performance by an Actress in a Miniseries or Motion Picture Made for Television, and the film was nominated for the Golden Globe Award for Best Miniseries or Television Film and the Golden Globe Award for Best Actor – Miniseries or Television Film for Treat Williams.

References

External links

 
 
 

1984 television films
1984 films
1984 drama films
ABC network original films
American drama television films
Films scored by Marvin Hamlisch
American films based on plays
Films directed by John Erman
Films set in New Orleans
Films shot in New Orleans
Television shows based on plays
Television remakes of films
Films based on works by Tennessee Williams
1980s English-language films